John Per Kenneth Johansson (2 May 1956 – 31 July 2021) was a Swedish Centre Party politician who was the governor of Värmland County between 2012 and 2018. He was a member of the Riksdag, from 1998 to 2012.

References

1956 births
2021 deaths
20th-century Swedish politicians
21st-century Swedish politicians
Governors of Värmland County
Members of the Riksdag 1998–2002
Members of the Riksdag 2002–2006
Members of the Riksdag 2006–2010
Members of the Riksdag 2010–2014
Members of the Riksdag from the Centre Party (Sweden)
People from Avesta Municipality